This is a list of the Italy national football team results from 1930 to 1949. During this period, Italy achieved first place at the 1934 and 1938 FIFA World Cup, the gold medal at the 1936 Olympic football tournament, and first place at the 1927–30 and the 1933–35 Central European International Cup as well as coming in second place at the 1931–32 and the 1936–38 editions of the latter tournament.

Results

1930

1931

1932

1933

1934

1935

1936

1937

1938

1939

1940

1942

1945

1946

1947

1948

1949

1Indicates new coach

Notes

References

External links
Italy - International Matches 1930-1939 on RSSSF.com
Italy - International Matches 1940-1949 on RSSSF.com

1930s in Italy
1940s in Italy
Italy national football team results